"Too Young" is the second single released by the German popband Queensberry. Written and composed by Eric Palmqvist and Kid Crazy, produced by Kid Crazy and Pete Kirtley for the Deluxe Edition of Queensberry's debut studio album Volume I, it was released as the band's second single on May 22 in Germany and Austria. The song also appeared on Queensberry's second studio album On My Own, which was released on November 6, 2009.

Live performances
On May 21, 2009, the song was performed live for the first time during the finale of Germany's Next Top Model, Cycle 4. On May 22, 2009 and November 30, 2009, the group performed the song in The Dome in Germany. "Too Young" was performed for the first time in the second line-up on June 30, 2010 on Wanna Challenge in Beijing, China. It has been featured on numerous other occasions, including the Radio Teddy Birthday in Potsdam on August 28 and the IFA Sommergarten in Berlin on September 4, 2010.

Music video
The music video for the song was shot in April 2009 in Miami, Florida. The video shows a young guy stealing a car with his girlfriend, then driving through the city. They stop at a superette and while the girl distracts the salesman, her boyfriend steals some beer. They leave the shop together and then happily drive through the city again, having the "time of their life". After stopping under a bridge, they get out and share a passionate kiss. The girl finds an engagement ring in a pack of "Lucky Charms", and the couple decides to get married in a small church. The groom carries the bride out of the church, then they continue to drive through the city. At high speed, they drive past a police man, who immediately chases them. They lose the police man, who finds only an empty car remaining. The couple now walk along the beach, hand-in-hand. Throughout the video, the four Queensberry girls are shown walking along the beach, having fun. In the end, they walk past the married couple.

Formats and track listings
These are the formats and track listings of major single releases of "Too Young."
CD Single
"Too Young"  - 3:40
"Flow"  (written by Mark Frisch, Anthony Galatis)  - 3:24

Digital iTunes Download
"Too Young"  - 3:40
"Flow" - 3:24
"Too Young" [M.A.T. Catwalk Mix] - 3:43

Charts

Weekly charts

Year-end charts

Release history

References

External links
 Queensberry.de — official website

2009 singles
Queensberry (band) songs
2009 songs
Warner Music Group singles